The 1st Natal Grand Prix was a motor race, run to South African Formula One-style rules, held on 17 December 1961 at Westmead Circuit, South Africa. The race was run over 89 laps of the circuit, and was won by British driver Jim Clark, in his Lotus 21.

There were no great differences between the local rules to which this race was run and the international Formula One rules, but for example sports car bodies were permitted, such as the Porsche special driven by Jennings.

Clark led the race from start to finish, with only Stirling Moss, who had started from the back of the grid, able to stay on the same lap by the end. The local South African entrants were outclassed, with the first of them finishing three laps down on Clark.

Results

References

 "The Grand Prix Who's Who", Steve Small, 1995.
 "The Formula One Record Book", John Thompson, 1974.
 Race results at www.silhouet.com 

Natal Grand Prix
Natal Grand Prix
December 1961 sports events in Africa
1961 in South African motorsport